Lee Soo-min (born October 5, 1984) is a South Korean actress. She is best known as a cast on the TV show The God of Music 2 and Saturday Night Live Korea. She was also the leader and rapper for the mockumentary group C.I.V.A.

Film

Variety show

References

1984 births
Living people
South Korean television actresses
South Korean female idols
South Korean television personalities
21st-century South Korean actresses